Güer Aike Department is a department in Santa Cruz Province, Argentina. It has a population of 113,267 and an area of 33,841 km². The seat of the department is in Río Gallegos which also has the majority of the population with 97,742. Veintiocho de Noviembre has the next largest population with 6,145 inhabitants. The name means 'large camp' in the aonikenk (or 'tehuelche') language of southern Patagonia.

Settlements
 El Turbio
 Julia Dufour
 Mina 3
 Río Gallegos
 Río Turbio
 Rospentek
 Veintiocho de Noviembre
 Güer Aike
 Camusu Aike

References
Instituto Nacional de Estadísticas y Censos, INDEC

Departments of Santa Cruz Province, Argentina